Hannah Turner Fairfield Nichols ( – ) was an American portrait painter. 

Hannah Turner Fairfield was born in Pomfret, Connecticut, the daughter of David and Hannah Turner Fairfield.  She studied painting under Francis Alexander and Alexander Robinson.  She was active as a portrait painter in New York City from around 1835 to 1839.  Her portraits were large, often of children, and featured a bright palette.

In 1839, she married businessman Franklin Nichols.  They moved to Norwalk, Connecticut and her painting career likely ended at that point.

References 
  

Created via preloaddraft
1808 births
1894 deaths
American women painters